Frank Romer Pierson (May 12, 1925 – July 22, 2012) was an American screenwriter and film director.

Life and career
Pierson was born in Chappaqua, New York, the son of Louise (née Randall), a writer, and Harold C. Pierson. Pierson's family was the subject of his mother's 1943 autobiography Roughly Speaking and a 1945 movie of the same name, starring Rosalind Russell and Jack Carson as his parents.

Pierson served in the Army during World War II, then graduated from Harvard. He worked as a correspondent for Time and Life magazines before selling his first script to Alcoa-Goodyear Theater. He got his break in Hollywood in 1958 as script editor for Have Gun – Will Travel and moved on to write for the television series Naked City, Route 66 and others. He wrote or co-wrote several successful films, including Cat Ballou and Cool Hand Luke, which were both nominated for Academy Awards.  He wrote Dog Day Afternoon, which won Pierson the Academy Award. He directed and contributed to the screenplay of the 1976 remake of A Star Is Born; and the in-fighting between himself, Barbra Streisand, Kris Kristofferson and producer (and at the time boyfriend of Streisand) Jon Peters on the film led him to write the article "My Battles with Barbra and Jon" for The Village Voice.

Pierson directed several films produced for television, including Dirty Pictures, Citizen Cohn, Conspiracy, and Somebody Has to Shoot the Picture. His direction on Conspiracy won a Directors' Guild Award for Best Television Movie, and his second Peabody  and BAFTA Award.

He was President of the Writers Guild of America, West (WGAW) from 1981 to 1983 and again from 1993 to 1995 and was President of the Academy of Motion Picture Arts and Sciences (AMPAS) from 2001 to 2005. In 2003, Pierson was the recipient of the Austin Film Festival's Distinguished Screenwriter Award. Screenwriter Brian Helgeland presented him with the Award. He was a consultant on Mad Men, co-writing (with Matthew Weiner) the fifth episode of its fifth season, "Signal 30", a member of the teaching staff of Sundance Institute, and artistic director of the American Film Institute.

Pierson died on July 22, 2012, in his home in Los Angeles, California. He was survived by his wife Helene and his two children.

Filmography

Director
Have Gun – Will Travel (1962) (TV series)
Route 66 (1963) (TV series)
 The Looking Glass War (1970)
 The Neon Ceiling (1971)
Nichols (1971) (TV series)
The Bold Ones: The New Doctors (1973) (TV series)
 A Star Is Born (1976)
 King of the Gypsies (1978)
Alfred Hitchcock Presents (1985) (TV series)
 Somebody Has to Shoot the Picture (1990)
 Citizen Cohn (1992)
 Lakota Woman: Siege at Wounded Knee (1994)
 Truman (1995)
 Dirty Pictures (2000)
 Conspiracy (2001)
 Soldier's Girl (2003)
 Paradise (2004)

Screenwriter
 Have Gun – Will Travel (1962) (TV series)
Naked City (1962-1963)
Route 66 (1963)
 Cat Ballou (1965)
The Happening (1967)
 Cool Hand Luke (1967)
The Looking Glass War (1969)
The 42nd Annual Academy Awards (1970)
The Anderson Tapes (1971)
Nichols (1971-1972)
The Bold Ones: The New Doctors (1973)
Amanda Fallon (1973)
 Dog Day Afternoon (1975)
A Star Is Born (1976)
King of the Gypsies (1978)
Haywire (1980)
In Country (1989)
 Presumed Innocent (1990)
The Good Wife (2010)
Mad Men (2012)

References

External links 
 
 Frank Pierson to Receive Edmund H. North Award WGA News, February 1999.

1925 births
2012 deaths
American film directors
American male screenwriters
Best Original Screenplay Academy Award winners
Presidents of the Academy of Motion Picture Arts and Sciences
Harvard College alumni
People from Chappaqua, New York
Directors Guild of America Award winners
Burials at Westwood Village Memorial Park Cemetery
Screenwriters from New York (state)